The 2009 Nova Scotia general election was held on June 9, 2009 to elect members of the 61st House of Assembly of the Province of Nova Scotia, Canada. The government was defeated on a money bill on May 4, and the Nova Scotia House of Assembly was dissolved by Lieutenant Governor Mayann Francis on May 5. thereby triggering an election. The NDP won a majority government, forming government the first time in the province's history, and for the first time in an Atlantic Canadian province. The governing Progressive Conservatives were reduced to third place.

Campaign
The election campaign began on May 5, 2009, after the New Democrats and Liberals voted against the Offshore Offset Revenues Expenditure Act, legislation that would have permitted the government to divert its revenues from oil and gas development in the Atlantic Ocean from debt payment, as required under current provincial law, to fund extra spending in the 2009 budget. As the Progressive Conservatives won only a minority government in the 2006 election, at least one of the two opposition parties would have been required to vote in favour of (or abstain from voting on) the legislation for it to pass.

Timeline 
June 13, 2006 - Rodney MacDonald's Progressive Conservatives are elected to a minority government.
June 20, 2006 - Liberal leader Francis MacKenzie resigns.
February 20, 2007 - Cumberland North MLA Ernie Fage is suspended from the Progressive Conservative caucus after Halifax Police charge him with failing to remain at the scene of an accident, following an incident in November 2006.
March 1, 2007 - NDP MLA Kevin Deveaux resigns his seat of Cole Harbour-Eastern Passage.
April 28, 2007 - Stephen McNeil is elected leader of the Nova Scotia Liberal Party.
October 2, 2007 - Becky Kent of the NDP is elected in the Cole Harbour-Eastern Passage byelection.
December 18, 2007 - Fage is convicted of leaving the scene of an accident, and is expelled from the Progressive Conservative caucus.
March 2, 2009 - Lunenburg MLA and Finance Minister Michael Baker dies.
May 4, 2009 - Government is defeated on a budget bill (Bill 240 - Offshore Offset Revenues Expenditure Act (amendments to Provincial finance Act)).
May 5, 2009 - Legislature is officially dissolved and election is called for June 9, 2009.

Results by party

Candidates lined up.

Results by region

Retiring incumbents
Progressive Conservative
Brooke Taylor, Colchester-Musquodoboit Valley
Jamie Muir, Truro-Bible Hill

Nominated candidates
Legend
bold denotes party leader
† denotes an incumbent who is not running for re-election or was defeated in nomination contest

Annapolis Valley

|-
|bgcolor=whitesmoke|Annapolis
|
|Kent Robinson97111.10%
|
|Henry Spurr1,13112.93%
||
|Stephen McNeil6,44673.70%
|
|Jamie Spinney1982.26%
|
|
||
|Stephen McNeil
|-
|bgcolor=whitesmoke|Clare
|
|Jimmy Doucet4598.75%
|
|Paul Comeau1,32625.29%
||
|Wayne Gaudet3,39264.68%
|
|Diane Doucet-Bean671.28%
|
|
||
|Wayne Gaudet
|-
|bgcolor=whitesmoke|Digby-Annapolis
|
|Cindy Nesbitt85215.39%
|
|Sherri Oliver1,09219.73%
||
|Harold Theriault3,51463.48%
|
|Namron Bean781.41%
|
|
||
|Harold Theriault
|-
|bgcolor=whitesmoke|Hants West
||
|Chuck Porter3,36437.24%
|
|Barbara Gallagher2,40126.58%
|
|Paula Lunn3,06533.93%
|
|Sheila Richardson2042.26%
|
|
||
|Chuck Porter
|-
|bgcolor=whitesmoke|Kings North
|
|Mark Parent3,07936.08%
||
|Jim Morton3,53541.43%
|
|Shirley Fisher1,54118.06%
|
|Anna-Maria Galante-Ward3784.43%
|
|
||
|Mark Parent
|-
|bgcolor=whitesmoke|Kings South
|
|David Morse2,75928.14%
||
|Ramona Jennex4,03841.18%
|
|Paula Howatt2,63926.91%
|
|Brendan MacNeill3693.76%
|
|
||
|David Morse
|-
|bgcolor=whitesmoke|Kings West
|
|Chris Palmer1,66720.20%
|
|Carol Tobin1,42217.23%
||
|Leo Glavine5,01560.77%
|
|Nistal Prem de Boer1491.81%
|
|
||
|Leo Glavine
|}

South Shore

|-
|bgcolor=whitesmoke|Argyle
||
|Chris d'Entremont3,15867.65%
|
|Melvin Huskins661.41%
|
|Lionel LeBlanc91319.56%
|
|Barbara Lake53111.38%
|
|
||
|Chris d'Entremont
|-
|bgcolor=whitesmoke|Chester-St. Margaret's
|
|Judy Streatch2,76227.47%
||
|Denise Peterson-Rafuse4,83548.09%
|
|Jo-Ann Grant2,12221.11%
|
|Ryan Cameron3353.33%
|
|
||
|Judy Streatch
|-
|bgcolor=whitesmoke|Lunenburg
|
|Peter Zwicker2,39928.30%
||
|Pam Birdsall4,06948.01%
|
|Rick Welsford1,37416.21%
|
|Jason A. Remai1451.71%
|
|Milton Countway4895.77%
|
|Vacant
|-
|bgcolor=whitesmoke|Lunenburg West
|
|Carolyn Bolivar-Getson3,04533.50%
||
|Gary Ramey3,60039.60%
|
|Mark Furey2,29725.27%
|
|Emily Richardson1481.63%
|
|
||
|Carolyn Bolivar-Getson
|-
|bgcolor=whitesmoke|Queens
|
|Kerry Morash1,93628.87%
||
|Vicki Conrad4,01259.82%
|
|Wayne Henley67410.05%
|
|Stuart Simpson851.27%
|
|
||
|Vicki Conrad
|-
|bgcolor=whitesmoke|Shelburne
|
|Eddie Nickerson1,63723.59%
||
|Sterling Belliveau3,84455.41%
|
|Darian Huskilson1,35619.54%
|
|Robin Smith1011.46%
|
|
||
|Sterling Belliveau
|-
|bgcolor=whitesmoke|Yarmouth 
||
|Richard Hurlburt4,53761.34%
|
|David Olie1,69622.93%
|
|David Mooney1,04114.07%
|
|Ronald Mills1231.66%
|
|
||
|Richard Hurlburt
|}

Fundy-Northeast

|-
|bgcolor=whitesmoke|Colchester-Musquodoboit Valley
|
|Steve Streatch2,26529.07%
||
|Gary Burrill3,69747.45%
|
|Willie Versteeg1,64921.16%
|
|Margaret Whitney1812.32%
|
|
||
|Brooke Taylor†
|-
|bgcolor=whitesmoke|Colchester North
||
|Karen Casey3,81150.25%
|
|Arthur Hartlen2,36231.14%
|
|Lorenda Ebbett1,25016.48%
|
|Judy Davis1612.12%
|
|
||
|Karen Casey
|-
|bgcolor=whitesmoke|Cumberland North
|
|Keith Hunter1,35917.23%
||
|Brian Skabar3,17040.19%
|
|Brent Noiles1,07313.60%
|
|Aviva Silburt1271.61%
|
|Ernest Fage2,15927.37%
||
|Ernest Fage
|-
|bgcolor=whitesmoke|Cumberland South
||
|Murray Scott4,33467.66%
|
|Don Tabor1,65925.90%
|
|Joseph Archibald3255.07%
|
|Danny Melvin881.37%
|
|
||
|Murray Scott
|-
|bgcolor=whitesmoke|Hants East
|
|Todd Williams1,56716.82%
||
|John MacDonell6,05264.96%
|
|Maurice Rees1,46715.75%
|
|Emerich Winkler2312.48%
|
|
||
|John MacDonell
|-
|bgcolor=whitesmoke|Truro-Bible Hill
|
|Hughie MacIsaac2,54430.23%
||
|Lenore Zann4,07048.37%
|
|Bob Hagell1,64319.52%
|
|Kaleigh Brinkhurst1581.88%
|
|
||
|Jamie Muir†  
|}

Central Halifax

|-
|bgcolor=whitesmoke|Halifax Chebucto
|
|David Atchison5446.91%
||
|Howard Epstein4,44656.47%
|
|Jane Spurr2,53532.20%
|
|Chris Hanlon3484.42%
|
|
||
|Howard Epstein
|-
|bgcolor=whitesmoke|Halifax Citadel
|
|Ted Larsen1,00012.99%
||
|Leonard Preyra3,78549.17%
|
|Gerry Walsh2,58433.57%
|
|Ryan Watson3294.27%
|
|
||
|Leonard Preyra
|-
|bgcolor=whitesmoke|Halifax Clayton Park
|
|Debbie Hum1,08410.56%
|
|Linda Power3,92438.24%
||
|Diana Whalen5,03049.02%
|
|Amanda Hester1721.68%
|
|Jonathan Dean510.50%
||
|Diana Whalen
|-
|bgcolor=whitesmoke|Halifax Fairview
|
|Paul Henderson89312.16%
||
|Graham Steele 4,68063.71%
|
|Brad Armitage1,54421.02%
|
|Jane Hester2293.12%
|
|
||
|Graham Steele
|-
|bgcolor=whitesmoke|Halifax Needham
|
|Jason Cameron5366.76%
||
|Maureen MacDonald5,33667.30%
|
|Graham Estabrooks1,69021.31%
|
|Kris MacLellan3674.63%
|
|
||
|Maureen MacDonald
|}

Suburban Halifax

|-
|bgcolor=whitesmoke|Bedford-Birch Cove
|
|Len Goucher2,26820.75%
|
|Brian Mosher3,55232.50%
||
|Kelly Regan4,86144.48%
|
|Neil Green2482.27%
|
|
||
|Len Goucher
|-
|bgcolor=whitesmoke|Halifax Atlantic
|
|Brian Phillips96511.22%
||
|Michèle Raymond5,25361.09%
|
|Jim Hoskins2,00323.29%
|
|Anthony Rosborough3784.40%
|
|
||
|Michele Raymond
|-
|bgcolor=whitesmoke|Hammonds Plains-Upper Sackville
|
|Barry Barnet2,21823.05%
||
|Mat Whynott4,81550.03%
|
|Patrick Doyle2,38124.74%
|
|Shawn Redmond2102.18%
|
|
||
|Barry Barnet
|-
|bgcolor=whitesmoke|Sackville-Cobequid
|
|Jessica Alexander97612.46%
||
|Dave Wilson5,12065.34%
|
|Scott Hemming1,54819.75%
|
|Ian Charles1922.45%
|
|
||
|Dave Wilson
|-
|bgcolor=whitesmoke|Timberlea-Prospect
|
|Gina Byrne7959.10%
||
|Bill Estabrooks6,17470.70%
|
|Lisa Mullin1,53517.58%
|
|Thomas Trappenberg2292.62%
|
|
||
|Bill Estabrooks
|-
|bgcolor=whitesmoke|Waverley-Fall River-Beaver Bank
|
|Gary Hines1,69618.45%
||
|Percy Paris5,00754.47%
|
|Bill Horne2,29024.91%
|
|Damon Loomer1992.16%
| 
|
||
|Percy Paris
|}

Dartmouth/Cole Harbour/Eastern Shore

|-
|bgcolor=whitesmoke|Cole Harbour 
|
|Mike Josey93911.05%
||
|Darrell Dexter5,84968.82%
|
|Tony Ince1,50917.76%
|
|Donna Toews2022.38%
|
|
||
|Darrell Dexter
|-
|bgcolor=whitesmoke|Cole Harbour-Eastern Passage
|
|Lloyd Jackson1,07415.90%
||
|Becky Kent4,40265.17%
|
|Orest Ulan1,05415.60%
|
|Denise Ménard2253.33%
|
|
||
|Becky Kent
|-
|bgcolor=whitesmoke|Dartmouth East
|
|Bert Thompson8739.60%
|
|Joan Massey3,90842.95%
||
|Andrew Younger4,13345.43%
|
|Anna Mukpo1842.02%
|
|
||
|Joan Massey
|-
|bgcolor=whitesmoke|Dartmouth North
|
|David Losey5687.95%
||
|Trevor Zinck4,05356.75%
|
|Jim Smith2,31632.43%
|
|Alex Donaldson2052.87%
|
|
||
|Trevor Zinck
|-
|bgcolor=whitesmoke|Dartmouth South-Portland Valley
|
|George Jordan1,38913.58%
||
|Marilyn More 5,58354.59%
|
|Colin Hebb2,94628.80%
|
|David Croft3103.03%
|
|
||
|Marilyn More
|-
|bgcolor=whitesmoke|Eastern Shore
|
|Bill Dooks2,55734.69%
||
|Sid Prest3,62849.22%
|
|Loretta Day Halleran99213.46%
|
|Michael Marshall1942.63%
|
|
||
|Bill Dooks
|-
|bgcolor=whitesmoke|Preston
|
|Dwayne Provo1,07624.83%
|
|Janet Sutcliffe1,31430.33%
||
|Keith Colwell1,88843.57%
|
|Sarah Densmore551.27%
|
|
||
|Keith Colwell
|}

Central Nova

|-
|bgcolor=whitesmoke|Antigonish 
||
|Angus MacIsaac3,61338.08%
|
|Maurice Smith3,33835.18%
|
|Miles Tompkins2,37825.06%
|
|Rebecca Mosher1601.69%
|
|
||
|Angus MacIsaac
|-
|bgcolor=whitesmoke|Guysborough-Sheet Harbour
|
|Ron Chisholm1,75024.96%
||
|Jim Boudreau3,62151.64%
|
|Lloyd Hines1,55822.22%
|
|Amy Florian831.18%
|
|
||
|Ron Chisholm
|-
|bgcolor=whitesmoke|Pictou Centre
|
|Pat Dunn3,51944.64%
||
|Ross Landry3,65046.30%
|
|Neil MacIsaac5677.19%
|
|Jim Lindsey1471.86%
|
|
||
|Pat Dunn
|-
|bgcolor=whitesmoke|Pictou East
|
|J. Ed MacDonald1,98425.94%
||
|Clarrie MacKinnon4,89363.98%
|
|Francois Rochon6428.39%
|
|Robbie Loftus White1291.69%
|
|
||
|Clarrie MacKinnon
|-
|bgcolor=whitesmoke|Pictou West
|
|Leonard Fraser1,46619.99%
||
|Charlie Parker4,22657.63%
|
|Paul Landry1,47120.06%
|
|Chelsea Richardson1702.32%
|
|
||
|Charlie Parker
|}

Cape Breton

|-
|bgcolor=whitesmoke|Cape Breton Centre
|
|Chris Ryan4797.53%
||
|Frank Corbett5,09680.14%
|
|Joe MacPherson68510.77%
|
|Chris Alders991.56%
|
|
||
|Frank Corbett
|-
|bgcolor=whitesmoke|Cape Breton North
||
|Cecil Clarke 3,47744.47%
|
|Russell MacDonald3,31242.36%
|
|Ken Jardine92111.78%
|
|Chris Milburn1081.38%
|
|
||
|Cecil Clarke
|-
|bgcolor=whitesmoke|Cape Breton Nova
|
|Cory Hann2764.14%
||
|Gordie Gosse4,73571.07%
|
|Donnie Morrison1,54923.25%
|
|Michael P. Milburn1021.53%
|
|
||
|Gordie Gosse
|-
|bgcolor=whitesmoke|Cape Breton South
|
|Steve Tobin1,38715.12%
|
|Wayne McKay3,33236.33%
||
|Manning MacDonald4,27846.65%
|
|Cathy Theriault1741.90%
|
|
||
|Manning MacDonald
|-
|bgcolor=whitesmoke|Cape Breton West
||
|Alfie MacLeod3,96243.47%
|
|Delton MacDonald2,79730.69%
|
|Josephine Kennedy2,21224.27%
|
|Michael Parsons1431.57%
|
|
||
|Alfie MacLeod
|-
|bgcolor=whitesmoke|Glace Bay
|
|Tom MacPherson81011.41%
|
|Myrtle Campbell2,82939.84%
||
|Dave Wilson3,38047.60%
|
|Todd Pettigrew821.15%
|
|
||
|Dave Wilson
|-
|bgcolor=whitesmoke|Inverness
||
|Rodney MacDonald8,71498.54%
|
|Michael MacIsaac1,97120.49%
|
|Shaun Bennett1,90519.81%
|
|Nathalie Arsenault3393.53%
|
|
||
|Rodney MacDonald
|-
|bgcolor=whitesmoke|Richmond
|
|John Greene1,04517.92%
|
|Clair Rankin1,47725.33%
||
|Michel Samson3,22855.36%
|
|John Percy811.39%
|
|
||
|Michel Samson
|-
|bgcolor=whitesmoke|Victoria-The Lakes
||
|Keith Bain2,41738.68%
|
|Fraser Patterson1,68026.88%
|
|Gerald Sampson1,91230.60%
|
|James V. O'Brien1432.29%
|
|Stemer MacLeod971.55%
||
|Keith Bain
|}

Opinion polls

References

2009 Nova Scotia Provincial General Election - Official Results

Bibliography

Further reading

External links
Elections Nova Scotia
CBC: Nova Scotia Votes 2009

2009
2009 elections in Canada
2009 in Nova Scotia
June 2009 events in Canada